Narasimhadeva was the third King of the Karnat dynasty of Mithila. Most scholars agree that he came into power around 1174 CE and succeeded his predecessor, Gangadeva.

Rule
The Maithili poet, Vidyapati, referred to Narasimhadeva as "Satyavira" due to how turbulent his reign was. He was engaged in a conflict with the King of Nepal who was his kinsmen. 
He also showed signs of defiance against Tughral Tughan Khan who responded by carrying out raids in Mithila and capturing Narasimhadeva who was later released in Darbhanga. He also engaged in a conflict with Iwaz Khalji who was the Governor of Bengal who undertook an expedition to Mithila and succeeded in compelling the Karnatas to pay tribute.  

Due to this, it has been said that Mithila first felt the presence of Muslim invasions during his reign.

References

History of Bihar
Mithila
12th-century monarchs in Asia
13th-century monarchs in Asia
12th-century Nepalese people
13th-century Nepalese people